Andrej Stojchevski (born 26 May 2003) is a Macedonian professional footballer who plays for MŠK Žilina as a midfielder or centre-back.

Club career

MŠK Žilina
Stojchevski made his Fortuna Liga debut for Žilina against Ružomberok on 4 May 2022. He appeared in the starting-XI of the away fixture.

References

External links
 MŠK Žilina official club profile 
 
 Futbalnet profile 
 

2003 births
Living people
Sportspeople from Skopje
Association football midfielders
Macedonian footballers
North Macedonia youth international footballers
North Macedonia under-21 international footballers
FK Vardar players
Akademija Pandev players
MŠK Žilina players
Macedonian First Football League players
2. Liga (Slovakia) players
Slovak Super Liga players
Macedonian expatriate footballers
Expatriate footballers in Slovakia
Macedonian expatriate sportspeople in Slovakia